Nora Maccoby is an American artist, filmmaker, and environmental activist.

In 2004, Maccoby created the bipartisan energy literacy initiative, Nature's Partners.

Nora wrote the screenplay for the movie Buffalo Soldiers that was released in 2001.

References

Year of birth missing (living people)
Living people
American artists
American filmmakers
American women environmentalists
American environmentalists
Maccoby family